"Da Doo Ron Ron" is a song written by Jeff Barry, Ellie Greenwich and Phil Spector. It first became a popular top five hit single for the American girl group The Crystals in 1963. American teen idol Shaun Cassidy recorded the song in 1977 and his version hit number one on the Billboard Hot 100 chart. There have also been many other cover versions of this song, including one by the songwriters Jeff Barry and Ellie Greenwich themselves, performing as The Raindrops.

Composition
The song is the first collaboration in songwriting by Jeff Barry, Ellie Greenwich and Phil Spector.  The song was composed over two days in Spector's office in New York. The title "Da Doo Ron Ron" was initially just nonsense syllables used as dummy line to separate each stanza and chorus until proper lyrics could be written, but Spector liked it so much that he kept it. Phil Spector did not want lyrics that were too cerebral and would interfere with a simple boy-meets-girl story line.  The rhymes of the opening lines, "I met him on a Monday and my heart stood still ... Somebody told me that his name was Bill" was inspired by Bill Walsh, a friend of Spector who happened to visit Spector while the three were writing the song.

The Crystals original version

Background
The Crystals recorded "Da Doo Ron Ron" in March 1963 at Gold Star Studios in Los Angeles. It was produced by Phil Spector in his Wall of Sound style. Jack Nitzsche was the arranger and Larry Levine the engineer. The drummer was Hal Blaine. Dolores "LaLa" Brooks was the lead vocalist. Brooks told the syndicated radio program Solid Gold Weekend that Cher was one of the singers backing her lead vocals.

On June 8, 1963, it reached number three on the Billboard Hot 100, and on June 22, 1963, number four on the Cash Box chart. It also reached number five in the UK.

Cash Box said that the song "relates the joy of a gal who has found THE guy, and it's done with appropriate good rock feeling," calling it a "solid follow-up to" the Crystals' previous hit "He's Sure the Boy I Love."

In 2004, the Crystals' song was ranked number 114 on Rolling Stones list of The 500 Greatest Songs of All Time. It was, however, removed from the same list in the 2010 update, being the highest-ranked of the 26 songs that were removed. But it was reinstated at No. 366 in the 2021 update. It was listed at number 528 by Q Magazine in their list of The 1001 Best Songs Ever, published in 2003. Berlin Media listed the song at number 43 on their list of The 100 Best Singles of All Time list published in 1998. It was also recognized by the Rock and Roll Hall of Fame as one of the "500 Songs That Shaped Rock". Billboard named the song #55 on their list of 100 Greatest Girl Group Songs of All Time.

Chart performance

Shaun Cassidy version

Background
"Da Doo Ron Ron" was covered in 1977 by teen idol Shaun Cassidy on his first solo LP, Shaun Cassidy, launching his career. His version was produced by Michael Lloyd and issued on Warner. It peaked at number one on the U.S. Billboard Hot 100. (The words were changed slightly to make it a boy-girl song, after The Searchers' cover version.)  The song was his first of three consecutive Top 10 U.S. hits. Cassidy's cover of "Da Doo Ron Ron" spent 22 weeks on the chart. It became a gold record, as did all of Cassidy's first three single releases.

Chart performance

Weekly charts

Year-end charts

Johnny Hallyday version (in French) 

The song was covered in French by  Johnny Hallyday. His version (titled "Da dou ron ron") was released in June 1963 and spent 12 weeks at no. 1 on the singles sales chart in France (from July 7 to September 13 and from September 21 to October 11). In Wallonia (French speaking Belgium) his single spent 24 weeks on the chart, peaking at number 2.

Charts

Other versions
 The Searchers included the song on their 1963 album, Meet the Searchers which charted at #2 on the British LP charts.
 Swedish singer Claes Dieden recorded a version of the song and released in as a single in early 1969; it became a large hit in Sweden, reaching number #1 on Tio i Topp and number #2 on sales chart Kvällstoppen.

Ian Matthews recorded an a cappella version of the song for his 1971 album Tigers Will Survive: issued as a single in January 1972 the track afforded Matthews his Billboard Hot 100 debut as a solo act albeit with a #96 peak, and #68 in Canada.
Australian Debbie Byrne released a single of "Da Doo Ron Ron" in 1974, which peaked at number 29 on the Australian Kent Music Report. The song is included on her debut studio album, She's a Rebel.

See also
"Car Crazy Cutie", a 1963 Beach Boys song with similar nonsense syllables

References

External links
 
 

1963 songs
1963 singles
1972 singles
1977 singles
1996 singles
The Crystals songs
The Beach Boys songs
Iain Matthews songs
The Searchers (band) songs
Shaun Cassidy songs
Sylvie Vartan songs
Johnny Hallyday songs
Songs written by Ellie Greenwich
Songs written by Jeff Barry
Songs written by Phil Spector
Song recordings produced by Phil Spector
Song recordings produced by Michael Lloyd
Song recordings with Wall of Sound arrangements
Billboard Hot 100 number-one singles
Cashbox number-one singles
RPM Top Singles number-one singles
Philles Records singles
Warner Records singles
Number-one singles in Sweden